Olaf Winter (born 18 July 1973 in Neustrelitz, Bezirk Neubrandenburg) is a German sprint canoeist who competed in the late 1990s and early 2000s (decade). Competing in two Summer Olympics, he won a gold medal in the K-4 1000 m event at Atlanta in 1996.

Winter also won a bronze medal in the K-2 1000 m event at the 1999 ICF Canoe Sprint World Championships in Milan.

He represented the sports clubs WSV Einheit Neustrelitz, SC Neubrandenburg and KG Essen. He lives in Hattingen.

References
DatabaseOlympics.com profile

Sports-reference.com profile

1973 births
Living people
People from Neustrelitz
People from Bezirk Neubrandenburg
German male canoeists
Sportspeople from Mecklenburg-Western Pomerania
Olympic canoeists of Germany
Canoeists at the 1996 Summer Olympics
Canoeists at the 2000 Summer Olympics
Olympic gold medalists for Germany
Olympic medalists in canoeing
ICF Canoe Sprint World Championships medalists in kayak
Medalists at the 1996 Summer Olympics